Jalan Tongkang Pechah (Johor state route J13) is a major road in Johor, Malaysia.

List of junctions

References 

Roads in Johor